Phaseolus acutifolius, also known as the tepary bean, is a legume native to the southwestern United States and Mexico and has been grown there by the native peoples since pre-Columbian times. It is more drought-resistant than the common bean (Phaseolus vulgaris) and is grown in desert and semi-desert conditions from Arizona through Mexico to Costa Rica. The waters requirements are low.

Description 

A narrow leafed, variety tenuifolius, and a broader leafed, variety latifolius, are known. Domestic varieties are derived from latifolius. Observation of "a limited number" of wild specimens suggested that "the flowers concur with the summer rains, first appearing in late August, with the pods ripening early in the fall dry season, most of them in October". The beans can be of nearly any color. There are many local landraces. Beans vary in size but tend to be small. They mature 60 to 120 days after planting.

Other names for this native bean include Pawi, Pavi, Tepari, Escomite, Yori mui, Yorimuni and Yori muni. The name tepary may derive from the Tohono O'odham phrase  or "It's a bean". Names that contain  in them typically refer to non-native species of beans since those names mean "non-Indian person's bean".

Cultivation 
Tepary beans have been grown by Native Americans for thousands of years; cultivated beans have been found dating to 500 BCE in the Tehuacán Valley in Mexico. Tepary beans appear to have been domesticated in a single event in northern Mexico, based on genetic evidence.

Tepary beans are very drought tolerant. Germination requires wet soil, but plants will flourish in dry conditions once established. Too much water inhibits bean production. They were cultivated by various methods, most commonly after an infrequent rain in the desert or after flood waters along a river or ephemeral stream had subsided. The tepary bean is relatively disease free, except under conditions of high humidity.

The tepary bean was a major food staple of natives in the Southwestern United States and northern Mexico. In addition to being grown in floodplains, it was often grown alongside squash and corn. Growing these plants together, known as Three Sisters agriculture, both enhances their growth and provides more balanced nutrition.

In the United States, the tepary bean was introduced to Anglo farmers in the 19th century by Tohono O'Odham (Papago) farmers. The Native American method of planting in the American Southwest was to plant three to five seeds in hills six to eight feet apart. Beans were planted in arroyos that had been recently flooded by summer rain.

Cultivation of tepary beans is possible under the most extreme conditions. The Sand Papago (Hia C-eḍ O'odham) were mainly hunter-gatherers but cultivated tepary beans and other crops when moisture made it possible for them to do so. In 1912, ethnographer Carl Lumholtz found small cultivated fields primarily of tepary beans in the Pinacate Peaks area of Sonora. In the 1980s author Gary Paul Nabhan visited this area, and found one farm family taking advantage of the first large rain in six years, planting seeds in the wet ground and harvesting a crop two months later. The most successful crops were tepary beans and a drought-adapted squash. Nabhan calculated that the cultivation in the Pinacate was the most arid area in the world where rain-fed agriculture is practiced.

Northwestern Mexico is the primary area of production for tepary beans. The tepary is also cultivated in many countries in Africa, Australia, and Asia. In India, tepary beans are an ingredient in the snacks "bhujia" and Punjabi Tadka by Haldiram's.

, the International Center for Tropical Agriculture in Colombia is testing crossbreeds of the tepary bean and common bean, in order to impart the tepary's drought and heat resistance. The latter could be especially helpful given climate change's effects on agriculture.

Heat stress resistance 
P. acutifolius is a sister species of P. vulgaris; genomic studies estimate that it diverged from P. vulgaris around ~2.1 Mya. As part of this divergence, the species duplicated genes that supported resistance to abiotic stress in arid zones: binding genes coding for chitin-binding proteins, kinase activity, cell wall macromolecule catabolic/metabolic processes and amino sugar metabolism (Example: Glucosamine). The tepary bean uses these amino sugars as a protection mechanism against heat stress, preventing proteins within the body of the plant from starting a denaturation process. 

A study, published in 2021, showed that when the tepary bean plant is exposed to high temperatures there is a negative regulation of the genes involved in cell division (GO:0048523; GO:0045786) and a positive regulation of those involved in arrest (GO: 0007050). This suggests that above 37°C cells that are in the cell division cycle is arrested in the G1-S phase; It seems that this is done by the cell in order to avoid the development of organism and thus conserve energy. Trehalose synthesis genes were also found to be overexpressed; trehalose is a sugar that in high concentrations is capable of protecting cell membranes and proteins from the denaturation process. A synteny analysis revealed that there is a intrachromosomal rearrangements on chromosomes 2 and 9, this changes could be a factor in the difficulties in developing fertile hybrids

Medical uses 

Research in the United States and Mexico suggest that lectin toxins and other compounds from tepary beans may be useful in chemotherapy for treating cancer. However, further research is needed.

References

External links 
 The Tepary Bean at slowfoodusa.org (archived)
 Bean, Tepary — Phaseolus acutifolius A. Gray at ufl.edu
 Papago (Tohono O'odham) Tepary Bean Soup at ocbtracker.com (archived)
 NRCS: USDA Plants Profile Phaseolus acutifolius A. Gray, var. acutifolius, var. latifolius Freeman
 
 
 

Acutifolius
Edible legumes
Flora of the Southwestern United States
Flora of Mexico
Flora of Costa Rica
Flora of Central America
Crops originating from the Americas
Plants used in Native American cuisine